Paul Hollywood's Pies and Puds is a British cookery television series that was first broadcast on BBC One in November 2013. Each episode shows Paul Hollywood cooking three recipes. In addition to that, he goes around the United Kingdom looking for traditional local recipes and the stories behind them.

Production
On 28 August 2013, Paul Hollywood appeared at the Chippenham Pit Stop café to film the fourteenth episode of the series. He cooked breakfast there, as well as pies made from ingredients used to serve breakfast.

On 30 August 2013, BBC Daytime announced that it had commissioned the twenty-part series. The series was commissioned by Gerard Melling. Damien Kavanagh, the head of BBC Daytime, said:Paul is much loved by BBC audiences and his new series will be a real treat for Daytime viewers, providing them not only with a baking masterclass but also the fascinating stories behind some unique recipes. Sweet or savoury, the series will feature something for everyone.

In October 2013, Hollywood visited Botton for filming the sixth episode.

Episode list

References

External links
 
 

British cooking television shows
2013 British television series debuts
English-language television shows
BBC Television shows
2013 British television series endings